Vinuda Liyanage (born 20 March 2002) is a Sri Lankan cricketer. He made his List A debut on 3 November 2021, for Lankan Cricket Club in the 2021–22 Major Clubs Limited Over Tournament.

References

External links
 

2002 births
Living people
Sri Lankan cricketers
Lankan Cricket Club cricketers
Place of birth missing (living people)